The La Crosse Spartans were a professional indoor football team based in La Crosse, Wisconsin. They were a member of the Great Lakes Division, of the United Conference of the Indoor Football League (IFL). They played their home games at the La Crosse Center in La Crosse, Wisconsin.

The team was founded in 2009, and was originally coached by former NFL player Gilbert Brown.  They were also coached by his brother Kyle Moore-Brown.

History
On August 6, 2009, Chris Kokalis announced his intentions to start an IFL team in La Crosse for the 2010 season. Former NFL player Gilbert Brown was announced as the head coach.  On August 27, the Spartans were conditionally approved as members of the IFL.  Such condition is that the Spartans negotiate a successful arena lease. On September 30, the Spartans got the formal go-ahead to play at the center. The Spartans were the third indoor football team to call the La Crosse Center home, following the La Crosse River Rats and the La Crosse Night Train.

2010 season
The inaugural season for the La Crosse Spartans was a difficult one. The schedule had the Spartans start the season with 3 tough road games against some of the best teams in the IFL. They lost at both Wichita and Sioux Falls, who eventually played against each other for the United Conference finals. Just before halftime of the very first game the Spartans would lose their starting Quarterback to a knee injury, beginning a season where they would go through multiple Quarterbacks and Kickers, trying to find the right fit for the team. They finished the first half of the season 0-7. The Spartans earned their first victory against the Chicago Slaughter on April 30 in La Crosse.  Their first road victory against at Chicago on June 12 .  They finished the season 3-11.

2011 season

The second season of the La Crosse Spartans began February 19, 2011, in the IFL’s showcase game, the Kickoff Classic.  La Crosse played seven regular season games at home over the course of February through early June.  Indoor football veteran Jose Jefferson joined the Spartans for the 2011 season as their Offensive Coordinator.

After four games of the 2011 season it was announced that head coach Gilbert Brown would be taking a leave of absence from the team for personal reasons, and that his brother Kyle Moore-Brown would be switching from assistant coach to head coach of the Spartans.

On April 30, 2011 the Spartans became one of the few teams in indoor football history to post a shutout, beating the Lehigh Valley Steelhawks 51-0.

On August 30, 2011, GM and co-owner Chris Kokalis announced the formation of the Cedar Rapids Titans, including former Spartans members Xzavie Jackson, Travis Miller and Mike Polaski.  The Titans were listed as members of the Great Lakes division, along with the Green Bay Blizzard, Bloomington Extreme and Chicago Slaughter. The Spartans were not listed in this division.  Kokalis said the Spartans franchise will "cease to exist", but also said that the team was up for sale.

Season-by-season results

Final roster

Attendance Statistics
Season By Season Average Attendance

Vs opponent

Year-by-Year Leaders
Passing (Yards/Touchdowns/Completions) 

Rushing (Yards/Attempts) 

Rushing (Touchdowns) 

Receiving (Yards/Touchdowns) 

Receiving (Receptions) 

All Purpose (Yards) 

All Purpose (Touchdowns)  

Returns (Yards/Returns) 

Returns (Touchdowns) 

Kicking (FG Percent) (minimum 10 attempts) 

Kicking (EP Percent) (minimum 10 attempts) 

Tackles 

Sacks 

Interceptions

Awards and honors
2011
 First Team All-IFL Defense (DL) - Xzavie Jackson
 Week 4 Defensive Player of the Week - Xzavie Jackson
 Week 10 Defensive Player of the Week - La Crosse Spartans Defense 
2010
 IFL Community Relations Award - La Crosse Spartans 
 First Team All-IFL Defense (DB) - Darnell Terrell
 Week 9 Offensive Player of the Week - Mark Bonds
 Week 16 Defensive Player of the Week - Darnell Terrell

See also
La Crosse River Rats
La Crosse Night Train

References

External links
 Official website
 Facebook Page
 Official Message Board
 Official Fan Site
 Twitter Page

 
Former Indoor Football League teams
American football teams in Wisconsin